I'll Give My Life is a 1960 American film directed by William F. Claxton. The film is also known as The Unfinished Task in the United States.

Plot 
John Bradford expects his son Jim to join his engineering firm, but Jim instead joins the ministry, attending a seminary for four years before being assigned to New Guinea.

John's secretary is Jim's sweetheart Alice, who is left behind for years before Jim proposes marriage. She goes to New Guinea, where they wed and become the parents of two children. All is well until Jim contracts a life-threatening disease. John flies to New Guinea to be with his son at the end of his life, then tries to understand its meaning and purpose through the journals Jim leaves behind.

Cast 
Ray Collins as John Bradford
John Bryant as James W. Bradford
Angie Dickinson as Alice Greenway Bradford
Katherine Warren as Dora Bradford
Donald Woods as Pastor Goodwin
Jon Shepodd as Bob Conners
Stuart Randall as Rex Barton
Richard Benedict as Cpl. Burr
Sam Flint as Roy Calhoun
Ivan Triesault as Dr. Neuman
Jimmy Baird as Jimmy Bradford
Mimi Gibson as Jodie Bradford
Milton Woods as Kopa, Medical Orderly
Virginia Wave as Miss Lane
Vera Frances as Tem Lane, Secretary

External links 

1960 films
1960 drama films
1960s English-language films
American black-and-white films
American drama films
Films directed by William F. Claxton
1960s American films